Gabriel José Pinto Couto (born 20 March 1981), simply known as Gabi is a Portuguese retired footballer who played as a midfielder.

Football career
Born in Fiães, Santa Maria da Feira, Gabi began in the lower leagues with Fiães S.C. before moving to C.D. Feirense in the second tier. He spent most of his career at that level with seven clubs, making 241 appearances and scoring 25 goals.

In July 2014, Gabi moved abroad for the only time in his career, from newly promoted Primeira Liga side F.C. Penafiel to Nea Salamis Famagusta FC of the Cypriot First Division. Six months later he was back in his country's second division, with Académico de Viseu FC.

References

External links
 
 

1981 births
Living people
Sportspeople from Santa Maria da Feira
Association football midfielders
Portuguese footballers
Portuguese expatriate footballers
C.D. Feirense players
C.D. Santa Clara players
S.C. Covilhã players
F.C. Arouca players
F.C. Penafiel players
Nea Salamis Famagusta FC players
Segunda Divisão players
Liga Portugal 2 players
Cypriot First Division players
Expatriate footballers in Cyprus
Portuguese expatriate sportspeople in Cyprus
Académico de Viseu F.C. players
C.D. Estarreja players
U.D. Oliveirense players